Blue Chips is a 1994 American sports drama film, directed by William Friedkin, written by Ron Shelton and starring Nick Nolte as a college coach trying to recruit a winning team. His players were portrayed by actors as well as real-life basketball stars Shaquille O'Neal and Anfernee "Penny" Hardaway and cameos include noted basketball figures Bob Knight, Rick Pitino, George Raveling, Bob Cousy, Larry Bird, Jerry Tarkanian, Matt Painter, Allan Houston, Dick Vitale, Jim Boeheim, Dan Dakich and Bobby Hurley, as well as actor Louis Gossett Jr.

Plot
Pete Bell, a college basketball coach for the Western University Dolphins in Los Angeles, is under a lot of pressure. His team is not winning as often as it once did and his successful program needs to attract new star players. But the brightest stars of the future—the so-called "blue-chip" prospects—are secretly being paid by other schools.

This practice is forbidden in the college game, but Pete is desperate after a losing season. A school booster, greedy "friend of the program" Happy, will stop at nothing to land these star high school players for Western's next season and gets the okay from the coach to do so. This includes offering a new car to the gigantic Neon Boudeaux (Shaq), a house and job to the mother of Butch McRae, and a tractor to the father of farmboy Ricky Roe, as well as a bag filled with cash.

With sportswriter Ed suspecting a scandal, Pete continues to be contaminated by demands from the players and a dirty association with the booster. His estranged wife, a former guidance counselor, agrees to tutor Neon, who has below average grades, but she feels betrayed when Pete lies to her about the new athletes receiving illegal inducements to attend the school.

Pete comes to realize that one of his senior players, Tony, a personal favorite, had "shaved points" in a game his freshman season, conspiring to beat a gambling point spread after carefully reviewing a video of the freshman season game depicting Tony's unusual behavior. Pete is disgusted at what he and his program have become.

Western University has a big nationally televised game coming up versus Indiana, the #1 team in the country, coached by Bobby Knight. After winning the game, Pete cannot bear the guilt of having cheated. At a press conference, he confesses to the entire scandal and resigns as head coach. Leaving the press conference and the arena, Pete walks past a small playground with kids playing basketball—he approaches, then helps coaching them.

An epilogue later reveals that the university would be suspended from tournament play for three years. Pete did continue to coach, but at the high school level; Tony graduated and played pro ball in Europe; Ricky Roe got injured and returned home to run the family farm, and Neon and Butch dropped out of college, but both now play in the NBA.

Cast
 Nick Nolte as Coach Pete Bell
 Mary McDonnell as Jenny Bell
 J. T. Walsh as "Happy" Kuykendahl
 Ed O'Neill as Ed
 Alfre Woodard as Lavada McRae
 Bob Cousy as Vic Roker
 Larry Bird as himself
 Matt Nover as Ricky Roe
 Shaquille O'Neal as Neon Boudeaux
 Anfernee "Penny" Hardaway as Butch McRae
 Anthony C. Hall as Tony
 Marques Johnson as Mel
 Robert Wuhl as Marty
 Cylk Cozart as "Slick"
 Jim Beaver as Ricky's Dad
 Louis Gossett Jr. as Father Dawkins (uncredited)
 Nigel Miguel as Dolphin Player
Cameos (Playing Themselves)
 Bobby Knight 
 Jerry Tarkanian
 Jim Boeheim
 Kevin Garnett
 Allan Houston
 Dick Vitale
 Todd Donoho
 Rick Pitino (credited as Richard Pitino)
 George Lynch
 Calbert Cheaney
 Bobby Hurley
 Eric Anderson
 Greg Graham
 Joe Hillman
 Jamal Meeks
 Keith Smart

Production
Blue Chips was filmed in Frankfort, Indiana (arena interior) and French Lick, Indiana, as well as in Chicago and New Orleans and in Los Angeles on the campus of the University of Southern California.

Nolte actually shadowed Bob Knight during many games in 1992 to research the role. Knight appears in the film as himself but has no scripted lines.

French Lick is the hometown of Larry Bird, who plays a scene with Nolte at the outdoor court of Bird's home. This was actually the same court (located on the property that Bird had purchased in the early 1980s) that was used in a Converse television commercial in 1984 starring Bird and Magic Johnson.

In a scene showing Nolte driving to French Lick, local radio station WSLM 98.9 FM can be heard in the car. In the final version, this scene was edited out.

Blue Chips features several famous players and coaches playing themselves, Jerry Tarkanian, Rick Pitino, Matt Painter, and Jim Boeheim among them. Legendary Boston Celtics point guard and Naismith Memorial Basketball Hall of Fame member Bob Cousy has a role as the athletic director of the college where Pete Bell is coach.

Blue Chips was Friedkin's first film for Paramount Pictures since 1977's Sorcerer, the production of which had strained his relationship with the studio for years. His next three films would also be released by Paramount. Some attributed this to his relationship with the head of Paramount Sherry Lansing.

Filming alongside Hardaway led O'Neal to recommend to the Orlando Magic that they select Hardaway – which they eventually did at the 1993 NBA Draft when they traded No. 1 overall pick Chris Webber to the Golden State Warriors for Hardaway and three future first-round draft picks. With both on their roster, the Magic recorded the best record in the Eastern Conference in the 1994-95 regular season and made the first NBA Finals appearance in franchise history.

Al Hoffman was Nolte's stand-in for the Indiana and Chicago portions of the film.

The pep band that performed in the film was composed of students from Lafayette Jefferson High School, Frankfort High School and a small number of local professionals under the direction of Jeff Parthun.

Reception
The film earned mixed reviews from critics. Hal Hinson of The Washington Post panned the film, writing, "The ostensible subject here is the big business of college athletics, and, just as The Program tried to do with college football, the film's purpose is to expose the corruption behind the scenes of so-called amateur athletics that have transformed the sport into a desperate money grab.  But, like The Program, this strident, unconvincing bit of movie muckraking uses our national sports mania to decoy us into sitting through a dreary lecture about ethics and moral corner-cutting.  What's most surprising here is that the assembled talent—from the worlds of basketball and movies—is so impressive and, still, the work is so tired. As the coach who exchanges his soul for a winning program, Nick Nolte struts and bellows in a desperate attempt to bring his character to life, and though he works up quite a lather, all he gets for the effort is sweat stains." Blue Chips currently holds a 37% rating on Rotten Tomatoes based on 27 reviews. Shaquille O'Neal was nominated for a Razzie Award for "Worst New Star". The film ranked No. 3 on Complex Magazine's Best Basketball Movies list.

Box office

The film debuted at number 3 at the US box office. It went on to gross $23 million in the United States and Canada but only $3.7 million international for a worldwide total of $26.7 million.

Friedkin later admitted the film was "weak at the box office. It's hard to capture in a sports film the excitement of a real game, with its own unpredictable dramatic structure and suspense. I couldn't overcome that."

Year-end lists 
Dishonorable mention – Glenn Lovell, San Jose Mercury News

References

Friedkin, William, The Friedkin Connection, Harper Collins 2013

External links

 
 
 
 

1994 films
1990s sports drama films
American basketball films
American sports drama films
1990s English-language films
Films directed by William Friedkin
Films set in Indiana
Films set in Los Angeles
Films shot in Chicago
Films shot in Indiana
Paramount Pictures films
1994 drama films
1990s American films